Rodmal Rathore is an Indian politician and member of the Bharatiya Janata Party. Rathore is a member of the Madhya Pradesh Legislative Assembly from the Tarana constituency in Ujjain district.

References 

Living people
Year of birth missing (living people)
People from Ujjain
Bharatiya Janata Party politicians from Madhya Pradesh
Madhya Pradesh MLAs 2008–2013